This is a list of Spanish television related events from 2017.

Events
 13 May - Manel Navarro and her song Do It for Your Lover scored 5 points at the Eurovision Song Contest 2017 in Kyiv, being ranked last.

Debuts

Television shows

Ending this year

Changes of network affiliation

Deaths
 9 January - José Luis Barcelona, host, 84.
 29 January - Paloma Chamorro, hostess, 68.
 24 March - Paloma Gómez Borrero, journalist and writer 82.
 14 May - Germán Yanke, journalist, 61.
 1 June - Fernando Medina, meteorologist, 88.
 5 June - Ketty Kaufmann, journalist, 83.
 16 June - Marisa Marco, voice actress, 70.
 11 August - Terele Pávez, actress, 78.
 11 November - Chiquito de la Calzada, comedian, 85.
 13 December - Alfredo Castellón, director, 87.
 29 December - Pedro Osinaga, actor, 81.

See also
 2017 in Spain

References